Amanda Linnea Fondell (born 29 August 1994, Linderöd, Sweden) is a Swedish singer and winner of the eighth series of Swedish Idol, which she won on 9 December 2011 with 52% of the votes.

Fondell's first single "All This Way" was released on 2 December 2011. The song was written and produced by Idol 2004 runner up Darin Zanyar, amongst others.

Discography

Albums

Extended plays

Singles

Other charted songs

References

1994 births
Living people
People from Kristianstad Municipality
Idol (Swedish TV series) winners
English-language singers from Sweden
21st-century Swedish singers
21st-century Swedish women singers
Melodifestivalen contestants of 2013